Singanallur Bus Terminus is one of the seven bus terminus in the Coimbatore City. It predominantly serves Mofussil buses,  although it also serves a few terminating intracity buses.

History
The bus stand was constructed to ease congestion in the Gandhipuram Central Bus Terminus. This bus stand was opened in 2002. It is located at the Southern end of Kamaraj Road and 0.5 km from Trichy Road. Buses plying in eastern direction via Palladam to Trichy, Tanjavur, Madurai, Theni, Dindigul, Rameshwaram, Tirunelveli, Nagercoil etc.  from Coimbatore are operated from this bus stand. Buses all time around the time ply from Singanallur to Gandhipuram. This bus terminus is well connected with Ukkadam Bus Terminus  and Gandhipuram Bus Terminus. All buses from Singanallur Bus terminus and Ukkadam Bus terminus pass through the Coimbatore Junction.
It includes cubicles where mothers can nurse their infants.

Route

Destinations
Madurai (via Dharapuram, Oddanchatram) at every 10 min (day)
Tiruchirapalli (via Karur) at every 10 min (day)
Thanjavur  (via Trichy)
Kumbakonam (via Tanjore)
Sivagangai 
(via Dharapuram, Oddanchatram, Madurai) at 12.05pm
Thirunelveli 
(via Dharapuram, Oddanchatram, Madurai, Sattur)
Rameswaram 
(via Dharapuram, Oddanchatram, Madurai, Ramnad) 
Theni 
(via Dharapuram Oddanchatram, Bathalagundu)
Nagercoil (via Dharapuram, Oddanchatram, Madurai, Tirunelveli)

Connections
The terminus is connected to all the 
major places within the city such as:

Town Hall - 8.1 km
Coimbatore Integrated Bus Terminus - 11 km
Gandhipuram Central Bus Terminus - 9 km
Ukkadam Bus Terminus - 8.3 km
Saibaba Colony Bus Terminus - 12 km
Coimbatore Junction - 7.9 km
Podanur Junction - 8 km
Coimbatore International Airport - 7.6 km.

Facilities
Cloak Room, Toilet, Snacks shop, Parking, TV, STD booths.

References

Bus stations in Coimbatore
Transport in Coimbatore